The Humanist Green Alliance (AHV) was a Chilean political party formed in 1990 by the Humanist Party and The Greens. In 1995, it was called the Humanist Party (PH).

History 

It was founded on May 4, 1990, through the merger of the Humanist Party and The Greens, whose constitution established its principles:

In its early years he was part of the ruling Concertación, and joined his list in municipal elections in 1992, where the party obtained 52,481 votes, equivalent to 0.82% of the vote, and their 24 candidates had 15 elected councilors, including Efrén Osorio for San Bernardo; and a mayor, Pablo Vergara Loyola for Ñuñoa.

In 1993 they decide to withdraw from the Concertación coalition and formed along the Ecologist Movement, the "New Left" list in the parliamentary elections of that year, besides presenting Cristián Reitze, a party member, as a presidential candidate. In parliamentary elections, the party won just over 1% of the total votes in the vote of deputies, without getting any elected.

June 3, 1994, it merged with the Ecologist Movement. Finally, the Green Humanist Alliance returned to the name of the Humanist Party in December 1995.

References 

Political parties established in 1990
Political parties disestablished in 1995
Defunct political parties in Chile
1990 establishments in Chile
1995 disestablishments in Chile